Lake Koosa is a lake of Estonia located in Vara Parish.

See also
List of lakes of Estonia

Koosa
Peipsiääre Parish
Koosa